"La Leggenda del Piave", also known as "La Canzone del Piave", is an Italian patriotic song written by E. A. Mario after the Battle of the Piave River in June 1918. In September 1943 the future king of Italy Umberto II chose it as the new national anthem replacing the "Marcia Reale". It remained the official anthem of Italy until June 1944, when Rome was liberated and the government and the King returned to the capital, the "Marcia Reale" was in fact reintroduced as a national anthem and remained both after the appointment of Crown Prince Umberto of Savoy as Lieutenant General of the Realm and after his elevation to King. After the 1946 Italian institutional referendum, the newly established Italian Republic selected "Il Canto degli Italiani" in its stead. Today, the song is popular in Italy and played by a military band on National Unity and Armed Forces Day (November 4).

Text
The song is divided in four parts and presents a brief history of the Italian front during World War I.

 The march of the Italian army in May 1915 from Veneto to the frontline.
 The Italian defeat at Caporetto.
 The resistance along the Piave river.
 The final battle at Vittorio Veneto and the victory.

Lyrics

Impact
The song was executed for the first time at the end of the battle held in June 23, 1918. General Armando Diaz addressed a personal telegram to the author to thank him for his musical contribution to the military victory of the Italian army.

In the years following World War I the song became an anthem dedicated to the resistance during the war.

E. A. Mario refused to gain money from "La Leggenda del Piave". In November 1941 he donated his and his wife's wedding rings, and the first 100 gold medals he received as a tribute for this song by the towns along the river Piave, war veterans' associations, and private citizens to the "Gold for the Fatherland" initiative.

"La Leggenda del Piave" was one of the candidates to become the anthem of the new Italian Republic. "Il Canto degli Italiani" was chosen instead.

Today "La Leggenda del Piave" is still widely popular, and the song is commonly played during official ceremonies to remember the fallen and the final victory.

References

External links
 played by Giovanni Martinelli (1918)

Italian patriotic songs
Italian anthems
1918 songs
World War I poems